Renascer (English: To be reborn) is a Brazilian telenovela produced and broadcast by TV Globo in 1993, written by Benedito Ruy Brabosa and directed by Luiz Fernando Carvalho.

Cast

First phase

Awards 
Troféu APCA (1993)
 Best Telenovela
 Best Actor - Antônio Fagundes
 Best Supporting Actor - Osmar Prado
 Best Supporting Actress - Regina Dourado
 Male revelation - Jackson Antunes

Troféu Imprensa (1993)
 Best Telenovela
 Best Actor - Antônio Fagundes
 Revelation of the Year - Jackson Antunes

References

External links 
 Renascer - Official website 
 

1993 telenovelas
Brazilian telenovelas
TV Globo telenovelas
1993 Brazilian television series debuts
1993 Brazilian television series endings
Telenovelas directed by Luiz Fernando Carvalho
Portuguese-language telenovelas